Keeble is a surname. Notable people with the surname include:

 Brian Keeble, author
 Charles Keeble, Australian figure skater
 Chris Keeble, British Army veteran
 Curtis Keeble, British diplomat
 Edwin Augustus Keeble, American politician
 Edwin A. Keeble (c. 1905–1979), American architect
 Frederick Keeble (1870–1952), English botanist
 George Keeble (1849–1923), English cricketer
 Jerry Keeble (born 1963), American football player
 Jim Keeble, British author
 Joe Keeble, American football player
 John Keeble (disambiguation) multiple people, including
 John Keeble, British pop musician
 John Bell Keeble (1868–1929), American attorney and academic administrator
 Marshall Keeble, American preacher
 Noel Keeble, British World War I flyer
 Sally Keeble, British Labour politician
 Vic Keeble, English footballer
 Woodrow W. Keeble, American soldier, Medal of Honor recipient

Fictional characters
 Lady Constance Keeble, fictional character by P. G. Wodehouse
 Samantha Keeble, fictional character from British TV series Eastenders

See also
 Keeble v Hickeringill, English legal case
 Keebles Hut, Australian alpine hut
 Keeble Observatory, astronomical observatory
 Gordon-Keeble, former British car marque
 Max Keeble's Big Move, Disney comedy film